The 30th Buil Film Awards ceremony is hosted by the Busan-based daily newspaper Busan Ilbo. It was held on October 7, 2021, at the Busan Exhibition and Convention Center (BEXCO Auditorium) in Busan. In addition to theater-released films, this year's nominations included Over-the-top (OTT) films such as the Netflix films The Call and Night in Paradise for the first time.

Judging panel
The judging panel consisted of 9 members: 
Kang Nae-young: professor of Theater and Film Art at Kyungsung University
Kim Sang-hoon: director of culture at Busan Ilbo 
Nam Dong-chul: program director of Busan International Film Festival
Oh Dong-jin: organizing director of Wildflower Film Awards
Yu Gina: film critic, professor of Film and Digital Media at Dongguk University 
Yoon Shin-ae: CEO of Studio 329 (produced Netflix series Extracurricular) 
Lee Moo-young: film director, professor of Film and Video at Dongseo University
Jeon Chan-il: film critic, chairman of the Korean Cultural Content Critics Association 
Jeong Min-ah: film critic, professor of Theatre and Film at Sungkyul University

Awards and nominations 
Complete list of nominees:
Winners:

Films with multiple nominations 
The following films received multiple nominations:

References

External links 
  
 30th Buil Film Awards at Daum 

Asian Film Awards ceremonies
Buil Film Awards
2021 film awards
Annual events in South Korea
2021 in South Korean cinema